Flashback is the second box set compilation by Electric Light Orchestra (ELO), released in November 2000 in the US and the following month in the UK.

History
In 2000, Jeff Lynne found a new impetus to work on the music of his old band and returned to the recording studio to work on an ELO project for the first time in some 15 years just prior to the comeback album Zoom in 2001. This work resulted in a digitally remastered compilation released in late 2000. Unlike its predecessors, this project, Flashback, was personally approved and endorsed by Lynne. The set includes songs featured from all 11 studio albums up to that point, including an edit of "Great Balls of Fire" from their live album The Night the Light Went On in Long Beach, plus some new recordings amongst the band's extensive back catalogue, most notably a reworking of Lynne's only UK number one hit "Xanadu". The album includes a booklet inside, plus liner notes by David Wild with quotes on each song from Lynne.

Track listing
All tracks written by Jeff Lynne, except where noted. Tracks marked (*) co-produced by Roy Wood.

CD 1

CD 2

CD 3

Personnel
Jeff Lynne – vocals, electric guitar, acoustic guitar, bass guitar, keyboards, drums, percussion, producer (1970-1986, 2000)
Roy Wood – vocals, electric guitar, classical guitar, cello, bass guitar, wind instruments, producer (1970)
Bev Bevan – drums, percussion, vocals (1970-1986)
Richard Tandy – keyboards, electric guitar, vocals (1970-1986)
Michael d'Albuquerque – bass guitar, vocals (1972–1974)
Kelly Groucutt – bass guitar, vocals (1975–1983)
Bill Hunt – french horn (1970)
Steve Woolam – violin (1970)
Wilfred Gibson – violin (1972-1973)
Mik Kaminski – violin (1973-1977, 1983)
Mike Edwards – cello (1972–1974)
Colin Walker – cello (1972-1973)
Hugh McDowell – cello (1973–1977)
Melvyn Gale – cello (1975–1977)
Marc Bolan – electric guitar on "Ma-Ma-Ma Belle" (1973)
Marc Mann – keyboards on "Xanadu", engineer, mastering assistant (2000)
Al Quaglieri – producer (2000)
Jeff Magid – producer (2000)
Doug Sax, Robert Hadley – digital remastering at The Mastering Lab, Hollywood, California
Ryan Ulyate – engineer, mastering assistant (2000)
David Wild - liner notes (2000)

See also
Afterglow

References

Albums produced by Jeff Lynne
Electric Light Orchestra compilation albums
2000 compilation albums
Epic Records compilation albums
Legacy Recordings compilation albums